Bangladesh–Bulgaria relations refers to the bilateral relations between Bangladesh and Bulgaria. Relations between the two countries have been regarded as cordial with both the nations showing willingness to strengthen it further. Bulgaria was also one of the few countries that recognized Bangladesh soon after its independence in 1971. Neither country has a resident ambassador.

Cooperation 
Agriculture, technology and cultural activities are all potential avenues for the advancement of bilateral cooperation between the two countries. In 2014, Bangladesh and Bulgaria signed an MoU on Foreign Office Consultation to hold regular consultations between the governments of the two countries in the areas of mutual cooperation.

Economic relations 
Bangladesh and Bulgaria have shown mutual interest to expand the bilateral economic activities between the two regions and have been working toward this end. Bangladeshi ready made garments, leather and jute products, ceramic and pharmaceuticals have been identified as having huge potential in Bulgarian market. Besides, ready made garments, textile, energy, petroleum, leather, ceramic, pharmaceuticals and aggro-processing industries have been identified as potential sector where Bulgarian entrepreneurs could invest.

See also 

 Foreign relations of Bangladesh
 Foreign relations of Bulgaria

References 

 
Bulgaria
Bilateral relations of Bulgaria